William Strang may refer to:

William B. Strang Jr. (1857–1921), American railroad magnate who founded Overland Park, Kansas
William Strang (1859–1921), Scottish painter and printmaker
William Strang (1878–1916), Scottish footballer
William Strang, 1st Baron Strang, (1893–1978), British diplomat

See also
Bill Strang (disambiguation)
William Strange (disambiguation)